The 1965–66 Soviet Cup was an association football cup competition of the Soviet Union. The winner of the competition, Dinamo Kiev qualified for the continental tournament.

Competition schedule

Preliminary stage

Group 1 (Russian Federation)

Preliminary round
 Avangard Kolomna              2-3  SERP I MOLOT Moskva

First round
 [Apr 25, 1965] 
 Baltika Kaliningrad           0-1  SATURN Rybinsk 
 DINAMO Bryansk                1-0  TekMash Kostroma 
 Granitas Klaipeda             0-0  Avtomobilist Leningrad 
 KHIMIK Novomoskovsk           2-0  Khimik Klin 
 Lokomotiv Kaluga              2-3  METALLURG Tula 
 METALLURG Cherepovets         2-0  Iskra Smolensk 
 ZVEJNIEKS Liepaja             1-0  Sever Murmansk 
 ZVEZDA Serpukhov              1-0  Serp i Molot Moskva

First round replays
 [Apr 26] 
 GRANITAS Klaipeda             3-0  Avtomobilist Leningrad

Quarterfinals
 [May 6, 1965] 
 KHIMIK Novomoskovsk           1-0  Metallurg Tula 
 METALLURG Cherepovets         1-0  Saturn Rybinsk 
 Zvejnieks Liepaja             1-2  GRANITAS Klaipeda 
 ZVEZDA Serpukhov              3-2  Dinamo Bryansk               [aet]

Semifinals
 [Jul 24, 1965] 
 GRANITAS Klaipeda             2-0  Metallurg Cherepovets 
 Khimik Novomoskovsk           0-4  ZVEZDA Serpukhov

Final
 [Aug 1, 1965] 
 GRANITAS Klaipeda             1-0  Zvezda Serpukhov

Group 2 (Russian Federation)

Preliminary round
 Progress Zelyonodolsk         1-1  Dinamo Kirov

Preliminary round replays
 PROGRESS Zelyonodolsk         1-0  Dinamo Kirov

First round
 [Apr 25, 1965] 
 KHIMIK Dzerzhinsk             2-0  Salyut Kamensk-Uralskiy 
 KOVROVETS Kovrov              1-0  Neftyanik Tyumen 
 PROGRESS Zelyonodolsk         2-0  Spartak Yoshkar-Ola 
 SPARTAK Ryazan                2-0  Zenit Izhevsk 
 TORPEDO Pavlovo               2-1  Uralets Nizhniy Tagil 
 Traktor Vladimir              0-2  RUBIN Kazan 
 Znamya Noginsk                1-2  ZVEZDA Perm 
 ZNAMYA TRUDA Orekhovo-Zuyevo  3-0  Khimik Berezniki

Quarterfinals
 [Jul 20, 1965] 
 PROGRESS Zelyonodolsk         1-0  Khimik Dzerzhinsk 
 RUBIN Kazan                   2-0  Znamya Truda Orekhovo-Zuyevo 
 TORPEDO Pavlovo               1-0  Kovrovets Kovrov 
 Zvezda Perm                   1-2  Spartak Ryazan

Semifinals
 [Sep 21, 1965] 
 Progress Zelyonodolsk         1-2  TORPEDO Pavlovo 
 RUBIN Kazan                   3-2  Spartak Ryazan

Final
 TORPEDO Pavlovo               w/o  Rubin Kazan

Group 3 (Russian Federation)

Preliminary round
 ENERGIYA Volzhskiy            1-0  Spartak Oryol 
 Volgar Astrakhan              0-0  Energiya Novocherkassk

Preliminary round replays
 Volgar Astrakhan              0-1  ENERGIYA Novocherkassk

First round
 [Apr 25, 1965] 
 PROGRESS Kamensk              2-0  Energiya Novocherkassk 
 SHAKHTYOR Shakhty             2-1  Trud Togliatti 
 Torpedo Armavir               1-2  SPARTAK Saransk 
 Torpedo Lipetsk               1-1  Spartak Belgorod 
 TORPEDO Taganrog              2-1  Spartak Tambov 
 Trud Penza                    0-2  METALLURG Kuibyshev 
 Trudoviye Rezervy Kursk       0-3  ENERGIYA Volzhskiy 
 Volga Ulyanovsk               1-2  NEFTYANIK Syzran

First round replays
 [Apr 26] 
 Torpedo Lipetsk               1-2  SPARTAK Belgorod

Quarterfinals
 METALLURG Kuibyshev           1-0  Neftyanik Syzran 
 Progress Kamensk              1-2  SHAKHTYOR Shakhty 
 SPARTAK Belgorod              1-0  Energiya Volzhskiy 
 Spartak Saransk               1-2  TORPEDO Taganrog

Semifinals
 [Sep 2, 1965] 
 METALLURG Kuibyshev           3-1  Spartak Belgorod 
 Shakhtyor Shakhty             1-2  TORPEDO Taganrog             [aet]

Final
 [Oct 27, 1965] 
 TORPEDO Taganrog              2-1  Metallurg Kuibyshev

Group 4 (Russian Federation)

Preliminary round
 DINAMO Kirovabad              3-1  Dinamo Baku 
 LORI Kirovakan                w/o  Sevan Oktemberyan 
 Metallurg Rustavi             0-2  MESHAKHTE Tkibuli 
 SHIRAK Leninakan              1-0  Alazani Gurjaani

First round
 [Apr 24, 1965] 
 DINAMO Batumi                 1-0  Dinamo Stavropol             [aet] 
 Dinamo Kirovabad              w/o  LORI Kirovakan 
 Dinamo Makhachkala            0-0  Polad Sumgait 
 Dinamo Sukhumi                1-1  Cement Novorossiysk 
 KOLKHIDA Poti                 2-1  Inguri Zugdidi 
 Shirak Leninakan              1-3  MESHAKHTE Tkibuli 
 SPARTAK Nalchik               1-0  Urozhai Maykop 
 SPARTAK Orjonikidze           3-2  Trudoviye Rezervy Kislovodsk [aet]

First round replays
 [Apr 25] 
 DINAMO Makhachkala            w/o  Polad Sumgait 
 DINAMO Sukhumi                4-2  Cement Novorossiysk

Quarterfinals
 [May 6, 1965] 
 KOLKHIDA Poti                 2-0  Dinamo Batumi 
 LORI Kirovakan                2-1  Spartak Nalchik 
 MESHAKHTE Tkibuli             3-1  Dinamo Sukhumi 
 SPARTAK Orjonikidze           4-0  Dinamo Makhachkala

Semifinals
 [Oct 30, 1965] 
 Lori Kirovakan                0-3  SPARTAK Orjonikidze 
 Meshakhte Tkibuli             1-1  Kolkhida Poti

Semifinals replays
 [Oct 31]
 MESHAKHTE Tkibuli             w/o  Kolkhida Poti

Final
 [Nov 14, 1965]
 Spartak Orjonikidze           1-1  Meshakhte Tkibuli

Final replays
 [Nov 15] 
 Spartak Orjonikidze           1-1  Meshakhte Tkibuli 
 [Nov 17] 
 SPARTAK Orjonikidze           2-1  Meshakhte Tkibuli

Group 5 (Russian Federation)

Preliminary round
 [Apr 18, 1965] 
 KHIMIK Chirchik               1-0  Spartak Andizhan 
 METALLIST Jambul              2-0  Khimik Salavat 
 METALLURG Chimkent            2-1  Dinamo Tselinograd 
 Sverdlovets Tashkent Region   0-6  IRTYSH Omsk

First round
 KHIMIK Chirchik               2-0  Metallist Jambul 
 METALLURG Chimkent            3-2  Irtysh Omsk 
 METALLURG Magnitogorsk        2-1  Zahmet Charjou 
 NEFTYANIK Fergana             2-0  Torpedo Miass 
 PAMIR Leninabad               3-0  Metallurg Zlatoust 
 Shakhtyor Osh                 1-1  Trud Kurgan 
 SPARTAK Samarkand             2-0  Lokomotiv Orenburg 
 STROITEL Ufa                  1-0  Zarafshan Navoi

First round replays
 Shakhtyor Osh                 1-5  TRUD Kurgan

Quarterfinals
 METALLURG Magnitogorsk        1-0  Spartak Samarkand            [aet] 
 PAMIR Leninabad               w/o  Metallurg Chimkent 
 STROITEL Ufa                  2-1  Khimik Chirchik 
 TRUD Kurgan                   2-1  Neftyanik Fergana            [aet]

Semifinals
 STROITEL Ufa                  5-2  Metallurg Magnitogorsk 
 TRUD Kurgan                   1-0  Pamir Leninabad

Final
 [Oct 9, 1965] 
 TRUD Kurgan                   2-1  Stroitel Ufa

Group 6 (Russian Federation)

Preliminary round
 ARMEYETS Ulan-Ude             2-1  Torpedo Tomsk 
 SIBSELMASH Novosibirsk        w/o  Metallurg Novokuznetsk 
 ZABAIKALETS Chita             w/o  Shakhtyor Prokopyevsk

First round
 [Apr 28, 1965] 
 AMUR Blagoveshchensk          1-0  SKA Khabarovsk 
 Armeyets Ulan-Ude             1-1  Zabaikalets Chita 
 CEMENTNIK Semipalatinsk       1-0  Irtysh Pavlodar              [aet] 
 LOKOMOTIV Krasnoyarsk         2-0  Khimik Kemerovo 
 Luch Vladivostok              0-0  Avangard Komsomolsk-na-Amure 
 Temp Barnaul                  0-0  Angara Irkutsk 
 TORPEDO Rubtsovsk             4-1  SibSelMash Novosibirsk       [aet] 
 VOSTOK Ust-Kamenogorsk        2-0  Start Angarsk

First round replays
 [Apr 29] 
 ARMEYETS Ulan-Ude             2-0  Zabaikalets Chita 
 Luch Vladivostok              0-1  AVANGARD Komsomolsk-na-Amure 
 TEMP Barnaul                  2-1  Angara Irkutsk

Quarterfinals
 [May 22, 1965] 
 Avangard Komsomolsk-na-Amure  0-0  Amur Blagoveshchensk 
 TEMP Barnaul                  2-1  Armeyets Ulan-Ude 
 TORPEDO Rubtsovsk             3-1  Lokomotiv Krasnoyarsk        [aet] 
 VOSTOK Ust-Kamenogorsk        2-0  Cementnik Semipalatinsk

Quarterfinals replays
 [May 23] 
 Avangard Komsomolsk-na-Amure  0-0  Amur Blagoveshchensk 
 [May 25] 
 AVANGARD Komsomolsk-na-Amure  2-1  Amur Blagoveshchensk

Semifinals
 [Aug 3, 1965] 
 AVANGARD Komsomolsk-na-Amure  2-1  Temp Barnaul 
 VOSTOK Ust-Kamenogorsk        4-1  Torpedo Rubtsovsk

Final
 AVANGARD Komsomolsk-na-Amure  2-0  Vostok Ust-Kamenogorsk

Group Central Asia and Kazakhstan

Preliminary round
 SHAKHTYOR Osh                 6-0  Pahtakor Kurgan-Tyube 
 SPARTAK Andizhan              3-1  Zahmet Charjou 
 SPARTAK Samarkand             2-0  Metallurg Chimkent

First round
 KHIMIK Chirchik               3-1  Pamir Leninabad 
 METALLIST Jambul              1-0  Zarafshan Navoi 
 METALLURG Almalyk             1-0  ADK Alma-Ata 
 METALLURG Temirtau            1-0  Dinamo Tselinograd 
 Spartak Andizhan              0-0  Shakhtyor Osh 
 SPARTAK Samarkand             1-0  Buhoro Buhara 
 SVERDLOVETS Tashkent Region   2-0  Dimitrovets Tashkent Region 
 VAKHSH Nurek                  3-2  Pahtaaral Gulistan

First round replays
 Spartak Andizhan              1-2  SHAKHTYOR Osh

Quarterfinals
 KHIMIK Chirchik               2-0  Spartak Samarkand 
 METALLURG Almalyk             2-0  Metallurg Temirtau 
 SHAKHTYOR Osh                 3-1  Metallist Jambul 
 VAKHSH Nurek                  3-2  Sverdlovets Tashkent Region

Semifinals
 KHIMIK Chirchik               4-1  Vakhsh Nurek 
 SHAKHTYOR Osh                 3-0  Metallurg Almalyk

Final
 KHIMIK Chirchik               1-0  Shakhtyor Osh

Final stage

Preliminary round
 [Jun 19] 
 ALGA Frunze                   3-0  Stroitel Ashkhabad 
 Desna Chernigov               0-1  AVYNTUL Kishinev 
 DNEPR Dnepropetrovsk          3-0  Baltika Kaliningrad 
 GRANITAS Klaipeda             2-1  Zvezda Kirovograd            [aet] 
 KHIMIK Chirchik               2-0  Avangard Kharkov 
 LOKOMOTIV Vinnitsa            3-2  Tavria Simferopol            [aet] 
 TEREK Grozny                  1-0  Dinamo Batumi 
 Trud Voronezh                 0-1  LOKOMOTIV Tbilisi

First round
 [Jun 18] 
 Dinamo Stavropol              1-1  RostSelMash Rostov-na-Donu  
   [? – Alexei Levchenko] 
 [Jun 19] 
 AVANGARD Komsomolsk-na-Amure  w/o  Kuban Krasnodar 
 Avangard Ternopol             0-2  URALMASH Sverdlovsk 
   [Vladimir Yerokhin, Anatoliy Zhos] 
 DINAMO Kirovabad              2-1  Sudostroitel Nikolayev 
   [? – Boris Baluyev] 
 DINAMO Leningrad              1-0  SKA Novosibirsk 
 ENERGETIK Dushanbe            4-0  SKA Kiev 
   [Vladimir Makarov, Gennadiy Shepilov, Yuriy Pekshev, Georgiy Gventsadze] 
 IRTYSH Omsk                   2-0  Neftyanik Fergana 
   [Anatoliy Grinko, Viktor Maksimenko] 
 KARPATY Lvov                  3-2  SKA Lvov 
 KUZBASS Kemerovo              w/o  Daugava Riga 
 LOKOMOTIV Chelyabinsk         7-1  Spartak Nalchik 
   [Gennadiy Yepishin-2, Anatoliy Tikhonov-2, Valeriy Bryabrin, Vladimir Mozzhukhin, Vladimir Korotayev - ?] 
 RUBIN Kazan                   5-1  Shirak Leninakan 
 SHINNIK Yaroslavl             1-0  Vostok Ust-Kamenogorsk 
   [Vladimir Bystrov] 
 SPARTAK Orjonikidze           2-1  Volga Gorkiy 
   [Mikhail Miroshnikov, Valeriy Babanov - ?] 
 Stroitel Ufa                  2-3  METALLURG Zaporozhye         [aet] 
   [Valentin Aksyonov, Leonid Permyakov - ?] 
 TEMP Barnaul                  2-0  Sokol Saratov 
   [Vladimir Akuzin, Vladimir Skorichenko] 
 TEXTILSHCHIK Ivanovo          3-0  Zarya Lugansk 
   [Vladimir Neboronov 15, Vladimir Belkov 40, 68] 
 Torpedo Pavlovo               0-0  Zvezda Perm 
 Torpedo Taganrog              1-3  SHAKHTYOR Karaganda          [aet] 
 TRAKTOR Volgograd             4-0  Politotdel Tashkent Region 
   [Viktor Orlov-3, Valeriy Pogorelov] 
 TRUD Kurgan                   2-0  Torpedo Tomsk 
 ŽALGIRIS Vilnius              4-0  Dinamo Tallinn 
 [Jun 20] 
 Spartak Gomel                 0-4  VOLGA Kalinin 
   [Yuriy Savchenko, Yevgeniy Zhuravlyov, Alexandr Stenishchev, Nikolai Timokhin] 
 [Jul 12] 
 ALGA Frunze                   w/o  Granitas Klaipeda 
 AVYNTUL Kishinev              6-0  Lokomotiv Vinnitsa 
 LOKOMOTIV Tbilisi             7-0  Khimik Chirchik 
 [Jul 14] 
 TEREK Grozny                  1-0  Dnepr Dnepropetrovsk         [aet]

First round replays
 [Jun 19] 
 DINAMO Stavropol              3-0  RostSelMash Rostov-na-Donu 
 [Jun 20] 
 TORPEDO Pavlovo               2-0  Zvezda Perm

Second round
 [Jul 11] 
 TRAKTOR Volgograd             4-1  Textilshchik Ivanovo         [aet] 
   [Valeriy Pogorelov-2, Alexandr Apshev, Viktor Zolenko – Gennadiy Shadrunov] 
 [Jul 18] 
 Spartak Orjonikidze           1-2  DINAMO Kirovabad 
   [Yuriy Savvidi - ?] 
 [Jul 19] 
 Avangard Komsomolsk-na-Amure  0-3  SHINNIK Yaroslavl 
   [Gennadiy Shilin-2, Vladimir Bystrov] 
 AVYNTUL Kishinev              2-0  Terek Grozny 
 DINAMO Leningrad              2-0  Žalgiris Vilnius 
 DINAMO Stavropol              2-0  Torpedo Pavlovo 
 KUZBASS Kemerovo              2-1  Trud Kurgan 
   [Gennadiy Trifonov, Vladimir Musokhranov - ?] 
 LOKOMOTIV Chelyabinsk         6-1  Irtysh Omsk 
   [Vladimir Mozzhukhin-2, Gennadiy Yepishin-2, Vladimir Korotayev, Alexandr Solovei – Zinoviy Bilen] 
 LOKOMOTIV Tbilisi             w/o  Alga Frunze 
 Metallurg Zaporozhye          0-2  RUBIN Kazan 
 SHAKHTYOR Karaganda           2-0  Energetik Dushanbe 
 Temp Barnaul                  1-3  KARPATY Lvov                 [aet] 
 Volga Kalinin                 1-1  UralMash Sverdlovsk

Second round replays
 [Jul 20] 
 Volga Kalinin                 0-2  URALMASH Sverdlovsk 
   [Anatoliy Artyukh, Sergei Okhremchuk]

Third round
 [Jul 23] 
 DINAMO Kirovabad              4-1  SKA Rostov-na-Donu           [aet] 
   [? – Yuriy Kolinko] 
 [Aug 6] 
 DINAMO Leningrad              1-0  Torpedo Kutaisi 
   [Vladimir Petrov 50] 
 Karpaty Lvov                  1-1  Zenit Leningrad 
   [Viktor Yevlentyev 15 – Evald Alam 60] 
 Kuzbass Kemerovo              1-2  CHERNOMORETS Odessa          [aet] 
   [Vladimir Razdayev 85 – Valeriy Lobanovskiy ?, 120] 
 LOKOMOTIV Chelyabinsk         2-1  Krylya Sovetov Kuibyshev 
   [Valeriy Ivanov 44, Anatoliy Tikhonov 75 – Yuriy Kapsin 89] 
 Lokomotiv Tbilisi             0-1  TORPEDO Moskva 
   [Vladimir Shcherbakov 46] 
 Rubin Kazan                   0-1  DINAMO Minsk 
   [Valentin Koltunov 71] 
 Shakhtyor Karaganda           1-2  DINAMO Moskva                [aet] 
   [Oleg Maltsev 62 – Boris Kokh 15, Viktor Anichkin 109] 
 SHINNIK Yaroslavl             3-1  Ararat Yerevan 
   [Anatoliy Maltsev, Gennadiy Zabelin, Vladimir Bystrov - ?] 
 TRAKTOR Volgograd             1-0  Neftyanik Baku               [aet] 
   [Valeriy Pogorelov 117] 
 [Aug 7] 
 Avyntul Kishinev              0-1  SPARTAK Moskva 
   [Vyacheslav Ambartsumyan 71] 
 Dinamo Stavropol              0-1  DINAMO Kiev 
   [Valeriy Porkuyan 58] 
 SHAKHTYOR Donetsk             3-1  Dinamo Tbilisi               [aet] 
   [Anatoliy Pilipchuk 34, 100 pen, Stanislav Yevseyenko 108 – Nomal Maisuradze 78] 
 URALMASH Sverdlovsk           3-1  SKA Odessa 
   [Vladimir Kapustin 12, Yuriy Zubkov 47, Sergei Okhremchuk 52 – Viktor Kotychenko 1] 
 [Aug 11] 
 PAHTAKOR Tashkent             2-0  CSKA Moskva 
   [Bohadyr Ibragimov 52, Gennadiy Krasnitskiy 74] 
 [Aug 13] 
 KAYRAT Alma-Ata               2-1  Lokomotiv Moskva 
   [Vladislav Markin 22, Sergei Kvochkin 59 – Vladimir Kozlov 67]

Third round replays
 [Aug 7] 
 Karpaty Lvov                  1-2  ZENIT Leningrad 
   [Anatoliy Kroshchenko 82 – Valentin Gusev 83, Nikolai Ryazanov 85]

Fourth round
 [Aug 13] 
 URALMASH Sverdlovsk        2-0  Lokomotiv Chelyabinsk 
   [Yuriy Zubkov 50, Vladimir Kapustin 73] 
 [Aug 23] 
 SPARTAK Moskva             2-0  Shakhtyor Donetsk 
   [Galimzyan Husainov 56, Nikolai Osyanin 90] 
 [Aug 25] 
 CHERNOMORETS Odessa        2-0  Pahtakor Tashkent 
   [Valeriy Lobanovskiy 35, Anatoliy Korshunov 51] 
 SHINNIK Yaroslavl          3-0  Dinamo Leningrad 
   [Vladimir Bystrov 19, 41, Anatoliy Maltsev 69] 
 [Aug 26] 
 DINAMO Kiev                3-0  Zenit Leningrad 
   [Ferents Medvid 36, 90, Andrei Biba 79] 
 DINAMO Minsk               2-1  Dinamo Moskva                [aet] 
   [Mikhail Mustygin 42, Igor Ryomin 110 – Igor Chislenko 87] 
 KAYRAT Alma-Ata            2-1  Dinamo Kirovabad 
   [Oleg Volokh 8, Vladislav Markin 10 – Muzafar Kasumov 85 pen] 
 TORPEDO Moskva             3-1  Traktor Volgograd 
   [Eduard Streltsov 9, ?, Valentin Denisov ? – Anatoliy Rebrov 57]

Quarterfinals
 [Sep 3] 
 CHERNOMORETS Odessa     3-1  UralMash Sverdlovsk 
   [Valeriy Lobanovskiy 22, 60, Oleg Bazilevich 68 – Sergei Okhremchuk 71] 
 [Sep 4] 
 TORPEDO Moskva          2-1  Kayrat Alma-Ata 
   [Eduard Streltsov 48, Vyacheslav Andreyuk 89 – Sergei Kvochkin 68] 
 [Sep 5] 
 DINAMO Minsk            1-0  Shinnik Yaroslavl              [aet] 
   [Mikhail Mustygin 109 pen] 
 [Sep 16] 
 DINAMO Kiev             4-1  Spartak Moskva 
   [Yozhef Sabo 32 pen, 81, Anatoliy Byshovets 49, 57 – Galimzyan Husainov 82]

Semifinals
 [Oct 7, Leningrad] 
 TORPEDO Moskva          3-0  Chernomorets Odessa 
   [Vladimir Brednev 22, Eduard Streltsov 88, 89] 
 [Oct 9, Tbilisi] 
 DINAMO Kiev             1-0  Dinamo Minsk                   [aet] 
   [Vasiliy Turyanchik 115]

Final

External links
 Complete calendar. helmsoccer.narod.ru
 1966 Soviet Cup. Footballfacts.ru
 1966 Soviet football season. RSSSF

Soviet Cup seasons
Cup
Cup
Soviet Cup